Odvogiin Baljinnyam (born 10 May 1960) is a Mongolian jacket wrestler whose won as  judoka and sambist. He competed at the 1988 Summer Olympics and the 1992 Summer Olympics.

References

1960 births
Living people
Mongolian male judoka
Olympic judoka of Mongolia
Judoka at the 1988 Summer Olympics
Judoka at the 1992 Summer Olympics
Place of birth missing (living people)
Competitors at the 1986 Goodwill Games
21st-century Mongolian people
20th-century Mongolian people
Mongolian sambo practitioners
Sambo (martial art) practitioners
Mongolian wrestlers